Graphomya eustolia is a species of fly from the family Muscidae. It occurs in Southern Africa.

References

Muscidae
Diptera of Africa
Insects described in 1849
Taxa named by Francis Walker (entomologist)